The president of Slovenia, officially the president of the Republic of Slovenia, is the head of state of the Republic of Slovenia. The position was established on 23 December 1991 when the National Assembly passed a new constitution as a result of independence from the Socialist Federal Republic of Yugoslavia.

According to the constitution, the president is the highest representative of the state. In practice, the position is mostly ceremonial. The president can appoint high ranking officials such as the head of the Central Bank of Slovenia, but they have to be confirmed by the parliament. Among other things, the president is also the commander-in-chief of the Slovenian Armed Forces. The office of the president is the Presidential Palace in Ljubljana.

The president is directly elected by universal adult suffrage for a term of five years. Any Slovenian citizen of legal age (18 or more) can run for President, but can hold office for only two terms.

The president has no legally guaranteed immunity and may be impeached.

List of presidents of Slovenia

Socialist Republic of Slovenia 
Parties;

Republic of Slovenia 
Parties;

Latest election

See also
Prime Minister of Slovenia

References

External links
Official site of the President of the Republic of Slovenia

 
Presidents
1990 establishments in Slovenia